The Organ is a 1965 Slovak film by Štefan Uher made at Filmové Studio Bratislava. The cast features Frantisek Bubik, Alexandr Brezina, and Kamil Marek. The plot concerns a young Polish deserter and a conservative Slovak priest sheltering from fascists.

References

1965 films
Czechoslovak drama films
Films about deserters
Films directed by Štefan Uher
1960s Czech films